The Nunavut Health Care Plan is the government health plan of the Canadian territory of Nunavut. All residents of Nunavut (with some exceptions) residing in the territory for at least three months with the intention of staying for at least twelve are eligible for coverage under the plan.

References
 Nunavut Health Care Plan

Health in Nunavut
Nunavut government departments and agencies
Health insurance in Canada